The Richmond Merchants were a minor league baseball team based in Richmond, California. In the 1910 and 1911 seasons, the Merchants played as members of the Class D level Central California League, winning the league pennant in the 1910 season.

History
Minor league baseball play was first hosted in Richmond, California in 1910. The Richmond "Merchants" team became members of the eight–team Class D level Central California League.

While Richmond remained stable during the two seasons of the Central California League, the other league franchises relocated often. The Central California League began play on April 17, 1910 and played through November 6, 1910. Of the eight Central California League teams that started 1910, including Richmond, seven moved during the year, three of them moved twice or more and three teams disbanded during the season. In all, 15 different sites were used in 1910, with two cities having two different teams.In the 1911 season, two Central California League teams moved and two folded before the league permanently folded on July 9, 1911. The league played a full schedule, but only the weekend games counted in the standings.

The 1910 Richmond Merchants won the Central California League pennant. Playing under manager John Luce, the Merchants ended the regular season with a record of 18–10, finishing 1.0 game ahead of the 2nd place Alameda Alerts. In the finals, the Alameda Alerts defeated Richmond 2 games to 0.

In 1911, Richmond continued Central California League play, before the league folded during its second season. After beginning play on April 8, 1911, the league folded on July 9, 1911, with Richmond in 4th place. The Merchants had a record of 8–6, playing under returning manager John Luce. Richmond finished 2.5 games behind the 1st place San Leandro Cherry Pickers.

Richmond, California has not hosted another minor league baseball franchise.

The ballpark
The name of the home minor league ballpark in Richmond in 1910 and 1911 is unknown.

Timeline

Year–by–year records

Notable alumni
The 1910 and 1911 Richmond Merchants rosters are unknown.

References

External links
Richmond - Baseball Reference

Defunct minor league baseball teams
Professional baseball teams in California
Defunct baseball teams in California
Baseball teams established in 1910
Baseball teams disestablished in 1911
1910 establishments in California
1911 disestablishments in California
Richmond, California
Central California League teams